Eugenio Bustingorri Oíz (born 28 December 1963) is a Spanish retired footballer who played as a left back.

He amassed La Liga totals of 345 matches and 21 goals during 11 seasons, almost exclusively with Osasuna.

Club career
Bustingorri was born in Zulueta, Navarre. Safe for one year with Atlético Madrid he played his entire professional career with local giants CA Osasuna, making his first-team – and La Liga – debut on 23 January 1983 in a 1–1 away draw against Valencia CF.

From 1984–85 onwards, Bustingorri was the club's undisputed first-choice, scoring a career-best five goals in 40 games (all starts) in 1986–87 in an eventual narrow escape from relegation. After returning from the Colchoneros in 1989, he retained its starting position: on 26 May 1991 he scored one of his two goals in the season in a 1–0 away win against RCD Español, as Osasuna finished a best-ever fourth and qualified for the second time in its history to the UEFA Cup; for his efforts during that campaign, he was named best left back in the league by Mundo Deportivo.

Bustingorri left Osasuna midway through 1994–95, with the team now in Segunda División. He went on play three years with neighbouring amateurs CD Izarra, being the player with the second-most matches played in the top flight for the former.

International career
Bustingorri played for Spain at two youth levels, and participated at the 1986 UEFA European Under-21 Championship as the national team finished as champions.

Honours
Spain U21
UEFA European Under-21 Championship: 1986

References

External links

1963 births
Living people
People from Cuenca de Pamplona
Spanish footballers
Footballers from Navarre
Association football defenders
La Liga players
Segunda División players
Segunda División B players
CA Osasuna B players
CA Osasuna players
Atlético Madrid footballers
CD Izarra footballers
Spain youth international footballers
Spain under-21 international footballers
Basque Country international footballers